American College High School commonly known as AC school is one of India's oldest schools. Established in British colonial times in the south Indian city of Madurai.

Sports 

For many years AC school has been noted for its sporting talents. The students from Sports Hostel run by the Sports Authority of Tamil Nadu in the premises of Race Course stadium in Madurai undergo their education in AC School. The sports hostels houses young talents in Athletics, Basketball and Football. Other than that AC school is one of the mightiest cricket playing schools in this part of Tamil Nadu.

The football team powered by the coaching of Sports hostel has achieved many milestones in the state. In 1992 the AC school guys beat the YMCA club of Chennai in a fascinating thriller at Jawaharlal Nehru Stadium, Tiruchirapalli in a tournament final. In those days YMCA was represented by professional footballers from all parts of the country. Then Head master of AC school Mr. Appa Samy announced a holiday to celebrate this victory.

For more than 15 years AC school dominated the Madurai Educational district cricket tournament by winning the Champions title continuously for 14 years. Many AC school alumnus play in A and B division of Madurai District Cricket Association league.

Though it doesn't have a strong hockey team, the school produced great talents in hockey. Illango, an AC school alumnus has represented India-under-19 team in hockey.

This school in the same manner has many talented teachers who knows how to make students concentrate both on studies and sports. The PT masters play a great role in bringing the school in the sports arena.

High schools and secondary schools in Tamil Nadu
Schools in Madurai